Cladara anguilineata, the angle-lined carpet moth, is a species of geometrid moth in the family Geometridae.

The MONA or Hodges number for Cladara anguilineata is 7638.

References

Further reading

 
 

Larentiinae
Articles created by Qbugbot
Moths described in 1867